The Yibir, also referred to as the Yibbir, the Yebir, the Yahhar or the Yibro, derived from an Aramaic ‘iḇray' word which means Jews, are a caste of Somali people. They have traditionally been endogamous. Their hereditary occupations have been magic making, leather work, the dispensing of traditional medicine and the making of amulets. They belong to the Sab clan and sometimes referred to as a minority clan, they perform menial tasks.

The Somali tradition holds that the Yibir are descendants of Mohammad Hanif of Hargeysa. Mohammad Hanif acquired a reputation as a pagan magician, according to Somali folklore, he was defeated by Yusuf bin Ahmad al-Kawneyn. According to this myth, the rest of the Somali society has ever since paid a small gift to a Yibir after childbirth, as a form of blood compensation.

The Yibir have a language (a dialect of Somali) they keep secret from the ruling Somali clans. Although Muslims and ethnically similar to other Somalis, the Yibir caste has been traditionally denigrated, demeaned and discriminated against by higher social strata of the Somali society.

Yibir Muslim Somali Origin

Foundation

The foundational for the Yibir involves one Shaykh Yusuf bin Ahmad al-Kawneyn, also known as Aw Barkhadle (Blessed Father), associated as one of those who brought Islam to Somalia from Arabia. The story goes that when Barkhadle first arrived in the northern Somali region, he was confronted by pagan Mohamed Hanif (also pejoratively known as Bu'ur Ba'ayer). The two leaders then decided to settle the issue of legitimacy between them via a test of mystical strength. Barkhadle challenged Hanif to traverse a small hill near Dogor, an area situated some 20 miles north of the regional capital of Hargeisa. Hanif twice successfully accomplished this task asked of him. However, during Hanif's third demonstration of his powers, Barkhadle "invoked the superior might of God and imprisoned his rival for ever within the mountain." Orthodox Islam thus prevailed over the old pagan cult. An alternate version states that Barkhadle murdered the pagan Hanif.

Hanif's descendants, goes the legend, subsequently demanded blood money or diyya from Barkhadle for the death of their leader and in perpetuity. Barkhadle granted them their wish. This myth underlies the Somali practice of offering gifts to Yibir who come to give amulets and bless newborn children and newlywed couples. Ever since, Somali have adhered to the custom of samanyo or samayo ("birth gift"), payment made to the Yibir by their Somali patrons.

One of the versions of the story is recorded in Yibir and translated into English by John William Carnegie Kirk. In 1921, Major H. Rayne, a district-commissioner in British Somaliland, also recounts the story, using it as a preface to an anecdote about a Somali who had just become a father and asked him for money to pay a passing Yibir.

Jewish origin

Yibir were an originally Jewish tribe  who, in a strongly Muslim country, became the low castes among Somalis. Some Yibir state that they are descendants of Hebrews who arrived in the area long before the arrival of Somali nomads.

Despite their Jewish origins, the overwhelming majority of the Yibir, like the Somali population in general, adhere to Islam and not Judaism. Their Hebrew origins has been offered as an explanation for the Yibir occupying a subordinate position in Somali society.

Social status

According to Teshale Tibebu – a professor of History specializing on Ethiopia and Horn of Africa, the Yibir along with Mijan and Tomal castes have traditionally been considered as ritually impure, and other caste members of the Somali society would never marry a member of the Tomal, Mijan and Yibir castes. They were, for many years, denied basic rights and opportunities for education.

Occupation
The Yibir traditionally were itinerant magicians. Their occupation in the Somalia have been similar to those of Dushan in southern Arabia, both being jesters in the employ of the chiefs. The Yibir also crafted hardas (amulets) containing verses from the Quran, prayer mats and leather goods such as saddles. These amulets have been in demand as protection from harm and illness during childbirth and other rites of passage.

The Yibir are skilled workers who engage themselves in the various jobs that city dwellers do, unlike the Somali nomads, their livelihood depends on their skills which requires them to make crafts and other object the Somali communities need. Traditionally, Yibirs are known for their religious rituals. When a child is born in Somalia, a person from the Yibir caste is invited to bless the child by giving a Quranic verse-containing amulet for protection, and in return the Yibir receives a payment for conducting the ceremony, then an amulet is placed on the child's neck to protect the child from evil eyes and any malicious acts. These amulets are traditionally worn by children everyday, in the superstitious belief of their protective powers, even when these children are allowed to run naked.

Contemporary situation
Yibir have a reputation for magic; one of their traditional functions is to bless the newborn and the newly married. In return for these blessings they receive gifts, a continual repayment for the killing of Mohammed Hanif. They subsist in two different ways—by being attached to noble Somali families, or by (cyclically) visiting different households. The payments they receive, called samanyo (described by an English scholar as a "tax"), also function to forestall the fear of a possible cursing of the (Somali) host by the Yibir soothsayer or magician; though the Yibir are the "smallest and most despised" clan of the sab, they are thought to have the strongest magic. Persistently refusing to give a gift on the occasion of a birth invites the curse of the Yibir, which is supposed to result in a violent death for the refusing party or a deformed new-born. Another of the Yibir's believed supernatural characteristics is that when they die they vanish: no one, according to Somali tradition, "has ever seen the grave of a Yibir", a quality possibly derived from the disappearance of their ancestor, Hanif.

There has been no census count and estimates about the Yibir community vary. In 2000, Ahmad Jama Hersi who is a Kenyan resident, guessed that 25,000 Yibir lived in Somalia and neighboring countries.

Language
The language of the Yibir (like that of the Madhiban) is described by early 20th century Western linguists as a dialect of the Somali language. Yibir and Madhiban are similar and share a number of words.

J.W.C. Kirk, a British infantry officer stationed in British Somaliland, published a grammar of Somali with an account of the Yibir and Midgan (i.e. Madhiban) dialects in 1905 and commented on the difference of the two dialects from the dominant Somali language. According to his sources, the difference is necessary to maintain a secrecy and keep the ruling class from total dominance of the subservient clans: 

Kirk stresses this desire for secrecy repeatedly: "Therefore I must ask any who may read this and who may sojourn in the country, not to repeat what I give here to any Somali, not of Yibir or Midgan birth"; a similar note was sounded by the German linguist Adolf Walter Schleicher in his 1892 grammar of the Somali language.

In more recent times, the linguist Roger Blench, referencing Kirk, has similarly indicated that the Yibir and Madhiban dialects both "differ substantially in lexicon from standard Somali". However, he remarks that it remains unknown whether this linguistic divergence is due to some sort of difference in code or is instead indicative of distinct languages.

Cognate castes in Horn of Africa
The Yibir caste is not an exception limited to the Somali ethnic group, and equivalent cognate caste is found in numerous ethnic groups in Horn of Africa and East Africa. According to Donald Levine – a professor of Sociology specializing in Ethiopian and Horn of Africa studies, similar caste groups in different languages and ethnic groups have been integral part of societies of this region. These strata have featured all the defining characteristics of caste, states Levine, characteristics such as "endogamy, hierarchy, status, concepts of pollution, restraints on commensality, a traditional occupation and membership by birth".

In east African ethnic groups, such as the Oromo people, cognates to Somali castes have been recorded in 16th century texts, states Cornelius Jaenen. Among Cushitic-speaking Bako people and others in the Horn of Africa, a similar despise and isolation has been targeted against a caste of negroid-origin people for magic and ritual services such as blessing babies, circumcision, and burying the dead.

The "Watta" people who are hunter gatherers among the Oromo people are also despised and occupy lowest strata in society.

References

Bibliography

Castes
Ethiopian-Jewish diaspora
Groups claiming Jewish descent
History of the Jews in East Africa
Jews and Judaism in Somalia
Somali clans
Somali clans in Ethiopia